Marymount MRT station is an underground Mass Rapid Transit (MRT) station on the Circle line in Bishan, Singapore.

Located underneath Marymount Road near the junction of Marymount Lane and Bishan Street 21, this station provides MRT access to residents living in the western part of Bishan New Town and Shunfu, as well as students and staff of the nearby Raffles Institution.

The station is named after the road of the same name on the surface, Marymount Road, which in turn took its name from the Marymount Convent of the Little Sisters of the Poor. It serves nearby businesses, housing developments and Raffles Institution, Shunfu market & food centre, Bao Guang Fo Tang and Shunfu residential area.

History

On 10 February 2004, Marymount Road was temporarily closed for realignment works. The options for station names were 'Marymount' and 'Shunfu', and in the end Marymount was chosen.
This station was a terminus for the Circle line until the opening of the HarbourFront portion of the Circle line on 8 October 2011. Before Upper Thomson opened in 2021, this station was the nearest MRT station within the Thomson area.

Art in Transit
In this station's Art in Transit, Joshua Yang's artwork Superstring consists of individual pieces constructed with only one continuous line that winds around itself to let the viewer explore real and virtual spaces.

References

External links
 

Railway stations in Singapore opened in 2009
Buildings and structures in Bishan, Singapore
Mass Rapid Transit (Singapore) stations
Railway stations in Central Region, Singapore